Katy Dunne and Tammi Patterson were the defending champions, but both players chose to participate with different partners. Dunne partnered Abigail Tere-Apisah, while Patterson chose to play alongside Ayaka Okuno. Patterson lost in quarterfinals to Naomi Broady and Asia Muhammad.

Broady and Muhammad won the title, defeating Dunne and Tere-Apisah in the final, 6–2, 6–4.

Seeds

Draw

Draw

References
Main Draw

Kurume U.S.E Cup - Doubles
Kurume Best Amenity Cup